The 1935 Denver Pioneers football team was an American football team that represented the University of Denver as a member of the Rocky Mountain Conference  (RMC) during the 1935 college football season. In their fourth and final season under head coach Percy Locey, the Pioneers compiled a 6–3 record (5–2 against conference opponents), finished fourth in the RMC, and outscored opponents by a total of 109 to 101.

Schedule

References

Denver
Denver Pioneers football seasons
Denver Pioneers football